Thomas Boissy is a French singer and songwriter who mixes Acoustic, Folk, Pop and Rock music. He lives in Paris, France. He started singing in musicals in the Folies Bergère and on French TV. In October 2007, he signed up to Sellaband and in February 2008 he reached the goal of US$50,000 to produce his own CD.

Year of birth missing (living people)
Living people
French singer-songwriters